Janet E. Steele is a professor of journalism at George Washington University's school of journalism and an author. She published a book with a collection of newspaper articles from Indonesia. She also published a book about Tempo, an Indonesian magazine, during the Soeharto era in Indonesia and wrote a biography of Charles Anderson Dana. It has been described as covering "the complete history of the Sun.

Steele found that experts appearing on television news programs are typically from a cadre of former political and military elites.

She was an assistant professor at the University of Virginia.

Bibliography
Mediating Islam, Cosmopolitan Journalisms in Muslim Southeast Asia (2018)
Email Dari Amerika (Email from America) (2014)
Wars Within: The Story of Tempo, an Independent Magazine in Soeharto’s Indonesia (2005)
The Sun Shines for All: Journalism and Ideology in the Life of Charles A. Dana (1993), Syracuse University Press

References

External links
Video of a 2013 address she gave via YouTube

Living people
American women writers
George Washington University faculty
University of Virginia faculty
Year of birth missing (living people)